A list of synagogues in Morocco:

Agadir
 Beth-El Synagogue

Asilah
 Kahal Synagogue

Azemmour
 Rabbi Abraham Moul Niss Synagogue

El Jadida
 Bensimon Synagogue

Casablanca
 Benarrosh Synagogue
 Em-Habanime Synagogue
 Tehila Le David Synagogue
 Temple Beth-El (Casablanca)
Ettedgui Synagogue
 Rabbi Amram Ben Diwan Synagogue

Essaouira
 Chaim Pinto Synagogue
 Rabbi David Bel Hazan Synagogue
 Simon Attias Synagogue
 Slat Lkahal Synagogue

Fes
 Ibn Danan Synagogue
 Slat Al Fassiyin Synagogue
 Simon Levy Synagogue

Marrakech
 Al Fassayn Synagogue
 Beth-El Synagogue
 Joseph Bitton Synagogue
 Rabbi Pichas HaCohen Azog Synagogue
 Rabbi Ya’akov Attias Synagogue
 Slat al-Azama Synagogue
 Slat Skaya Synagogue

Meknes
 Rabbi Meir Toledano Synagogue

Oujda
 Grande Synagogue of Oujda
 Spanish Synagogue

Rabat
 Rabbi Shalom Zaoui Synagogue
 Talmud Torah Synagogue

Sefrou
 En Habbalim Synagogue

Tangier
 Beit Yehuda Synagogue
 Moshe Nahon Synagogue
 Rabbi Akiba Synagogue
 Shaar Rafael Synagogue

Tetouan
Isaac Ben Walid Synagogue

References

Synagogues

Morocco